IST Entertainment (Hangul: 아이에스티엔터테인먼트) is a South Korean entertainment company under Kakao Entertainment.

History

Plan A Entertainment
In 2011, A Cube Entertainment was established as an independent label of Cube Entertainment. A Cube signed its first solo artist Huh Gak and launched girl group Apink, which was made up from former Cube Entertainment trainees.

In November 2015, LOEN Entertainment (later Kakao M and then Kakao Entertainment) acquired 70% of the entire label and subsequently absorbed it as an independent subsidiary. The label announced in March 2016 that it has been renamed Plan A Entertainment since it was no longer affiliated with Cube Entertainment. It launched its first boy group Victon in November that year.

In early 2018, Plan A Entertainment acquired Kakao M's actor agency E&T Story Entertainment, owning 60% of the agency's shares. In the following months, Choi Jin-ho (founder and co-CEO) resigned and 30% of the remaining shares were sold for 3.51 billion won. As a result, it became a wholly owned subsidiary of Kakao M.

Fave Entertainment

Fave Entertainment was originally founded in 2012 as LOEN Tree, to manage LOEN Entertainment's recording artists. It was spun-off as a separate subsidiary label in 2016 and renamed Fave Entertainment. Artists who were transferred to Fave Entertainment included Fiestar, History, IU and Sunny Hill. Its trainees have notably featured in MIXNINE, Under Nineteen, and Produce 101. In October 2018, the label announced its upcoming girl group, temporarily known as "Fave Girls".

Cre.ker Entertainment

Cre.ker Entertainment is a record label founded by Kakao Entertainment (formerly LOEN Entertainment) in 2014, the label is home to artist groups Melody Day and The Boyz.

2019–present: Merged agency named to IST Entertainment 
On February 13, 2019, Kakao Entertainment released a statement that Plan A Entertainment and Fave Entertainment would be merging on April 1. Plan A Entertainment, being the surviving entity in the merger, was renamed Play M Entertainment   and absorbed Fave Entertainment's assets and remaining artists, including trainees. 

In May 2020, it was announced that "Fave Girls", who became "Play M Girls" following the merger, would be debuting in June as Weeekly. It is the company's first girl group since Apink.

On September 17, 2021, Kakao Entertainment announced that Play M Entertainment and Cre.ker Entertainment would be merging in the future.

On November 12, 2021, it was announced that the company's new corporate name would be IST Entertainment, which took in effect on November 1.

On February 7, 2022, IST Entertainment announced the debut of a new boy group in the second half of the year through a reality competition show, The Origin – A, B, Or What?.  The show premiered on March 19, 2022.  On the finale episode aired on May 7, 2022, it was announced that the final 7 will debut as ATBO, and will debut in July 27.

On April 11, 2022, IST Entertainment and Universal Music Japan announced the foundation of their joint venture label, "Universal Music IST".

Artists

Groups
 Apink
 Victon
 The Boyz
 Weeekly
 ATBO

Soloists
 Jeong Eun-ji
 Oh Ha-young
 Han Seung-woo
 Kim Nam-joo
 Do Han-se

Notable trainees
 Huening Bahiyyih (Kep1er)

Former artists

IST Entertainment 
 Weeekly
 Shin Ji-yoon (2020–2022)
 Victon
 Heo Chan (2016–2022)
 Bandage (2020–2023)
 Lim Hyeong-bin (2020–2022)
 Lee Chan-sol (2020–2023)
 Kang Kyoung-yoon (2020–2023)
 Shin Hyun-bin (2020–2023)

Former label 

A Cube Entertainment / Plan A Entertainment / Play M Entertainment
 Apink
 Hong Yoo-kyung (2011–2013)
 Son Na-eun (2011–2021)
 Lim Ji-min (2019–2021)
 Huh Gak (2011–2021)

Cre.ker Entertainment
 Melody Day (2014–2018)
 Yeo Eun (2014–2018)
 Yoo Min (2014–2018)
 Ye In (2014–2018)
 Cha Hee (2014–2018)
 The Boyz
 Hwall (2017–2019)

E&T Story Entertainment
 Park Han-deul
 Kim Ye-eun
 Go Na-hee
 Ahn Soo-min
 Shin Hyeon-Seung (2020-2021)
 Jung Soo-hyun
 Kim So-hyun (2017–2021)

LOEN Tree / Fave Entertainment
 KRun
 Park Ji-yoon (1997–1999)
 Gain (2011–2013)
 Mario (2011–2013)
 Sunny Hill (2011–2017)
 Fiestar (2012–2018)
Cheska (2012–2014)
Jei (2012–2018)
Linzy (2012–2018)
Hyemi (2012–2018)
Yezi (2012–2018)
Cao Lu (2012–2018)
 IU (2012–2018)
 History (2013–2017)
 Song Kyung-il (2013–2019)
 Na Do-Kyun (2013–2019)
 Kim Shi-hyoung (2013–2019)
 Kim Jae-ho (2013–2019)
 Jang Yi-jeong (2013–2019)
 Shin Zisu (2015–2016)
 I.B.I (2016)
 JBJ (2017–2018)

Discography

Projects

Notes

References

External links
 
IST Entertainment on Naver Post

IST Entertainment
Record labels established in 2011
South Korean record labels
Labels distributed by Kakao M
Talent agencies of South Korea